Pacchimiriam Adiappayya was a famous court musician at the Maratha kingdom of Thanjavur in the 18th century. He belongs to Kannada Madhwa Brahmin community. Famous musicians Veena Venkatamaramana Das of Vijayanagaram and Veena Seshanna of Mysore are his descendants. He was a composer of Carnatic music. Some of his famous disciples were Syama Sastri, one of the Trinity of Carnatic composers, and Ghanam Krishna Iyer. His compositions are in the Telugu language.

Pacchimiriam Adiappayya's most famous composition is the varnam Viriboni in Bhairavi ragam.

See also
List of Carnatic composers

References

 M. V. Ramana, Pre-trinity composers of Tamil Nadu - Carnatica.net
 Carnatica.net

Carnatic composers